Joseph Spencer DeJarnette (September 29, 1866 – September 3, 1957) was the director of Western State Hospital (located in Staunton, Virginia) from 1905 to November 15, 1943. He was a vocal proponent of racial segregation and eugenics, specifically, the compulsory sterilization of the mentally ill.

Early life
Joseph DeJarnette was born on his family's plantation, Pine Forest, in Spotsylvania County, Virginia to parents Elliott Hawes DeJarnette, formerly a Captain in the Confederate Army and Evelyn Magruder DeJarnette. The DeJarnettes were descended from French Huguenot immigrants who settled in Virginia during the colonial period and had been prominent in Virginia planter class society for generations. His maternal grandfather Benjamin Henry Magruder was a prominent Virginia lawyer and legislator, and in 1864, was elected to the US House of Representatives. His uncle Daniel Coleman DeJarnette was a prominent Virginia politician who served in the Virginia House of Delegates, United States Congress and the Confederate Congress during the Civil War.

After graduating from the Medical College of Virginia in 1888, DeJarnette practiced at the R. E. Lee Camp Confederate Soldiers' Home in Richmond for a year before joining the staff of the Western Lunatic Asylum in Staunton. The asylum was renamed Western State Hospital in 1894. On February 14, 1906, he  married a colleague, Dr. Chertsey Hopkins, a physician at Western State Hospital, as he was advised that being a married man was necessary for career advancement. She continued to practice medicine following the marriage and the couple had no children.

Career
In 1906, DeJarnette worked with Aubrey Strode and Albert Priddy to establish the Virginia State Colony for Epileptics and Feebleminded in Lynchburg.

A devout Presbyterian, DeJarnette supported the temperance movement. He believed that sterilizing people with certain traits that he believed to be hereditary would prevent these traits from being passed on to future generations. “To this class of the unfit belong the insane, the epileptic, the alcoholic, hereditary criminal, the syphilitic, the imbecile and the idiot, and none of these should reproduce,” DeJarnette wrote. “If proper steps be taken, the unfit can be made to grow annually smaller, and finally disappear entirely from our registers.”

In the early 1920s, DeJarnette, began lobbying intensively for the Commonwealth of Virginia to pass a compulsory sterilization law. He became so frustrated with his opponents in the Virginia assembly that he said "When they voted against it, I really felt they ought to have been sterilized as unfit." When E. Lee Trinkle, a longtime political colleague of Strode and supporter of the eugenics movement, was elected Governor of Virginia in 1922, DeJarnette achieved an influential political supporter for his campaign. In order for the bill to pass the legislature, the men focused on changing public sentiment by broadening the public’s knowledge of eugenic science and the laws of hereditary defect. Governor Trinkle released a report on the critical financial condition of the Commonwealth. Within the report, Trinkle reported that one of the largest contributions to Virginia’s dire financial state was the increased spending on institutionalizing what he called "defectives". Trinkle advocated the compulsory sterilization law as a cost-saving strategy for public institutions that had experienced growth in the incarceration of what he referred to as feeble-minded and defective populations. Trinkle added that legalizing sterilization for the insane, epileptic, and feeble-minded persons would allow these patients to leave the institutions and not propagate their own kind. Virginia's “Eugenical Sterilization Act,” was signed into law by Trinkle on March 20, 1924.  DeJarnette testified against Carrie Buck as an expert witness in the important eugenics case Buck v. Bell, in which the United States Supreme Court affirmed the constitutionality of Virginia's eugenics law, in a case that has been questioned since but never expressly overruled.

In 1932, DeJarnette opened a self-supporting, semiprivate mental hospital for middle-income patients,adjacent to Western State which the General Assembly named the DeJarnette State Sanatorium after him. In 1933, when Adolf Hitler rose to power as Chancellor of Germany and instituted the world's most ambitious eugenics program, DeJarnette closely watched its progress and wrote favorably of the Nazi eugenics program. In 1934, he begged the General Assembly to broaden the scope of Virginia's sterilization law; "the Germans," DeJarnette complained, "are beating us at our own game and are more progressive than we are."

In 1938, DeJarnette compared the progress of eugenics in the United States unfavorably with that in Nazi Germany, stating "Germany in six years has sterilized about 80,000 of her unfit while the United States with approximately twice the population has only sterilized about 27,869 to January 1, 1938 in the past 20 years... The fact that there are 12,000,000 defectives in the US should arouse our best endeavors to push this procedure to the maximum.".

DeJarnette was also a poet of sorts. He wrote a poem entitled Mendel's Law: A Plea for a Better Race of Men, which he read in public on a number of occasions.  An excerpt follows:

This is the law of Mendel,
And often he maken it plain,
Defectives will breed defectives,
And the insane breed insane.
Oh why do we allow these people
To breed back to the monkey's nest,
To increase our country's burdens
When we should only breed the best?

In 1943, State Hospital Board board removed him as superintendent of Western State due to concerns over his autocratic leadership style and the decrepit condition of the hospital. He remained in charge of the semi-private DeJarnette Sanatorium until 1947 and continued to advocate eugenics after the Nazi Holocaust was exposed at the end of World War II.

DeJarnette died in 1957 and was interred next to his wife, who had predeceased him, in her family cemetery in Bath County, Virginia.

Legacy
The DeJarnette Sanatorium, opened in 1932, was named for him. In the 1960s, the name was changed to The DeJarnette Center for Human Development. It was converted to a children's mental hospital in 1975, at which time it ceased to be a private enterprise, and the state of Virginia took over operation of the facility. In 1996, a new complex known as the DeJarnette Center was constructed. Although eugenic sterilization continued in Virginia until 1979, by the turn of the 21st century eugenic ideas were no longer considered politically correct and were being widely rejected as pseudoscience. This has significantly harmed the reputation of DeJarnette and other 20th century eugenicists whose ideas were once considered scientific and progressive. In 2001, the Virginia General Assembly renamed the Dejarnette Center the Commonwealth Center for Children and Adolescents due to Dr. DeJarnette's involvement with eugenics.

See also
 Racial Integrity Act of 1924

References

External links
 Western State Hospital
 Commonwealth Center for Children and Adolescents
 Photos of the abandoned DeJarnette Sanitorium
 Video Presentations about the former DeJarnette Sanitorium 
 Two Faces:  The Personal Files of Dr. Joseph E. DeJarnette, at Virginia Memory
 Joseph Spencer DeJarnette on Encyclopedia Virginia

1866 births
1957 deaths
Neo-Confederates
Physicians from Virginia
People from Staunton, Virginia
American eugenicists
Medical College of Virginia alumni